Panda Oy is a Finnish confectionery company based in Vaajakoski, Jyväskylä. The company was founded in 1920 by SOK (Suomen Osuuskauppojen Keskuskunta). Panda is known for its liquorice and chocolate products.

In 2005, the company was sold to Felix Abba, which is part of the Norwegian Orkla Group.

History

The beginning stages 
SOK founded Panda in 1920. The name then was simply SOK's confectionery factory. In 1929, it moved to an extension built next to the margarine factory. In the early years, the product selection consisted only of hard candies and marmalade. The production of chocolate began in the new building, and licorice began to be produced in the following decade. During the war years, the product selection was reduced, and at the end of 1942, only carrot marmalade was available, but during the shortage, even this went like hot stones. After the war, regulation made confectionery production difficult, but in the 1950s, even this became easier and the industry began to grow rapidly.

References

External links 

Brand name confectionery
Finnish chocolate companies
Food and drink companies established in 1920
Finnish brands
Food and drink companies of Finland
1920 establishments in Finland